Shawbrook Bank Limited is a retail and commercial bank in the United Kingdom. It is an operating entity of Shawbrook Group plc which was listed on the London Stock Exchange until it was acquired by a consortium led by BC Partners and Pollen Street Capital in July 2017.

History
The bank launched in 2011 after private investors led by RBS Equity Finance, which was later spun off from the Royal Bank of Scotland Group and became Pollen Street Capital, bought Whiteaway Laidlaw Bank from the Manchester Building Society. Whiteaway Laidlaw Bank rebranded as Shawbrook Bank in October 2011.

Singers Asset Finance was acquired in March 2012 and then rebranded as Shawbrook Asset Finance in March 2013. The bank acquired asset based lender Centric Commercial Finance in June 2014 and subsequently rebranded it as Shawbrook Business Credit. The bank was the subject of an initial public offering in April 2015, raising £90m of cash to support the capital position and future growth.

A consortium led by BC Partners and Pollen Street Capital acquired the business for £868 million in July 2017.

Operations
The bank offers loans to small and medium-sized businesses which are unable to obtain finance from the main commercial banks.

References

External links

Companies based in Brentwood, Essex
Banks of the United Kingdom
Banks established in 2011
2011 establishments in the United Kingdom